Yeshivas Ner Yisroel of Toronto (Ner Israel Yeshiva College) is a Haredi yeshiva (Jewish educational institution) in Vaughan, Ontario, Canada with government recognition of its degree-granting programs. The yeshiva includes both a Beis Midrash program and a high school.

Programs
The yeshiva has been granted restricted degree-granting authority by the Legislative Assembly of Ontario, to grant degrees in the field of religious studies and research in higher Jewish learning at the Bachelors, and Masters levels. In addition, the college offers University Diplomas and Certificates.

The current Roshei HaYeshiva (headmasters) are Rabbi Uri Mayerfeld and Rabbi Meyer D. Greenberger. The Menahel of the High School is Rabbi Moshe Englander. The Mashgiach of the High School is Rabbi Yerucham F. Kravetz.

The current Rebbeim (religious studies faculty) are: Rabbis Enkin and Spinrad (grade nine), Rabbis Garfunkel and Greenberg (grade ten),  Rabbi Faivushevitz and Rabbi Heller and Rabbi Diena(grade eleven), and Rabbi Nulman and Rabbi Hirsh and Rabbi Richter(grade twelve).

The head of the general studies department is Jory Vernon.

History
The yeshiva was established by  Rabbi Sholom Gold in 1959 as a branch of Yeshivas Ner Yisroel in Baltimore (NIRC).
Meyer Lebovic and Rabbi Moshe Hochman were also involved. The yeshiva opened in September of that year with 12 students. The yeshiva has grown to approximately 130 students since then. It is no longer affiliated with Ner Yisroel in Baltimore.

In 1964 Rabbi Yaakov Weinberg came from NIRC and assumed the post of Rosh Yeshiva until 1971. The yeshiva was next headed by Rabbi Naftali Friedler. The mantle of Rosh Yeshiva was then assumed by Rabbi Gavriel Ginsburg in 1988.

Former Roshei Yeshiva
 Rav Reuven Silver

See also
Ontario Student Assistance Program
Higher education in Ontario
List of yeshivas

References

External links
 Yeshivas Ner Yisroel of Toronto

Haredi Judaism in Canada
Haredi yeshivas
High schools in Toronto
Orthodox yeshivas in Canada
Universities and colleges in Ontario
Educational institutions established in 1959
1959 establishments in Ontario
Jewish schools in Canada